Wesley "Rabbit" Wilkins was an American Negro league outfielder in 1909 and 1910.

Wilkins made his Negro leagues debut in 1909 with the Kansas City Giants and played with the club again the following season. In three recorded games, he posted two hits in 13 plate appearances.

References

External links
Baseball statistics and player information from Baseball-Reference Black Baseball Stats and Seamheads

Year of birth missing
Year of death missing
Place of birth missing
Place of death missing
Kansas City Giants players